The Rokstarr Collection is the first compilation album by English R&B recording artist Taio Cruz. It was released on 20 September 2010. According to Cruz's website, the album combines "the biggest hits of Taio’s debut album 'Departure' and recent album 'Rokstarr'". The album includes all of Cruz's singles from his first two studio albums, excluding "No Other One". The album also includes album tracks and the American version of "Break Your Heart", featuring Ludacris. Island Records added the video advertisement for the collection to their YouTube account on 18 August 2010.

The album was also a success on the charts of the Billboard Hot 100, Canadian Hot 100 and also reached the number-one spot on the Australian charts. On 26 September 2010, The Rokstarr Collection debuted at number 16 on the official UK Albums Chart, becoming Cruz's third consecutive top 20 album.

Background
Speaking to Nesta McGregor of the BBC Newsbeat, Cruz admitted that releasing a greatest hits collection was "insane" after only having released two albums: I've been so fortunate to release so many singles. I've got six singles off the first album and another five singles off this new album, so there's definitely a lot of records that people will have heard before but not necessarily known that it was me. But they liked the song."

Critical reception
The Rokstarr Collection received a mixed reception from critics. Pip from 'Entertainment Focus' gave the compilation a positive reception. Pip said "[the compilation] brings together the biggest smashes of Taio's career in one hit-packed album. The sheer weight of hits offers further proof that pound for pound, Taio Cruz is right up there as one of the handful of guaranteed hit maker/writer/artist/producers currently working in pop music." However, Ruth of 'Female First' was less impressed, the review, she called the release "ambitious". She said that "although 'Dynamite' has shifted 1.5 million unites across the pond AND his debut US single 'Break Your Heart' has gone on to sell over 5 million worldwide, can anyone name five Taio Cruz tracks? Not only that, but the CD only has 15 songs on there, one which is on TWICE… come on Taio, who are you trying to kid?"

Track listing

^ Version D features a rap by Stryder at the start, and the remainder of the song performed by Cruz. This version is exclusive to this release. It is one of five different versions of the song.

Charts

Certifications

Release history

References

2010 compilation albums
Island Records albums
Taio Cruz albums

fr:Rokstarr
it:Rokstarr
nl:Dynamite (Taio Cruz)
pl:Rokstarr
pt:Rokstarr